is a station on the Tama Toshi Monorail Line in Hachiōji, Tokyo, Japan.

Lines
Matsugaya Station is a station on the Tama Toshi Monorail Line and is located 15.1 kilometers from the terminus of the line at Kamikitadai Station.

Station layout
Matsugaya Station is a raised station with two tracks and two opposed side platforms, with the station building located underneath. It is a standardized station building for this monorail line. Each platform is equipped with one elevator and one escalator which connect the platform level and the concourse level; the concourse is connected via a pedestrian deck to ground level (which, unusually for a raised station, is level with the concourse). The station is generally unattended and is monitored remotely via surveillance cameras.

Platforms

History
The station opened on 10 January 2000.

Station numbering was introduced in February 2018 with Matsugaya being assigned TT02.

Surrounding area
The station serves the Kashima and Matsugaya areas of Tama New Town, running above Tokyo Metropolitan Route 156. There are few shops or municipal facilities nearby, only homes and apartment buildings; the station surroundings are therefore very quiet. Two parks and several schools are also nearby.

References

External links

 Tama Monorail Matsugaya Station 

Railway stations in Japan opened in 2000
Railway stations in Tokyo
Tama Toshi Monorail
Hachiōji, Tokyo